The Platycraninae are an anareolate subfamily of stick insects in the family Phasmatidae.  Their known distribution includes southern, southeast Asia and Australasia.

Genera
The Phasmida Species File lists two tribes:
 monotypic tribe Platycranini Brunner von Wattenwyl, 1893
 Platycrana Gray, 1835

Stephanacridini 
Auth:  Günther, 1953
 Diagoras Stål, 1877 - monotypic Diagoras ephialtes Stål, 1877
 Eucarcharus Brunner von Wattenwyl, 1907
 Hermarchus Stål, 1875
 Macrophasma Hennemann & Conle, 2006
 Nesiophasma Günther, 1934
 Phasmotaenia Navas, 1907
 Sadyattes Stål, 1875
 Stephanacris Redtenbacher, 1908

References

External links

Phasmatodea subfamilies
Phasmatodea of Asia